Kopanina may refer to the following places in Poland:
Kopanina, part of the Grunwald district of Poznań
Kopanina, Leszno County in Greater Poland Voivodeship (west-central Poland)
Kopanina, Szamotuły County in Greater Poland Voivodeship (west-central Poland)
Kopanina, Wągrowiec County in Greater Poland Voivodeship (west-central Poland)
Kopanina, Piotrków County in Łódź Voivodeship (central Poland)
Kopanina, Sieradz County in Łódź Voivodeship (central Poland)
Kopanina, Lower Silesian Voivodeship (south-west Poland)
Kopanina, Opole Voivodeship (south-west Poland)
Kopanina, Silesian Voivodeship (south Poland)
Kopanina, Świętokrzyskie Voivodeship (south-central Poland)